Jolson is a musical with a book by Francis Essex and Rob Bettinson and a score composed of tunes by some of the all-time greatest songwriters of Tin Pan Alley.

Premise 
Based on the life of singer Al Jolson, one of America's most popular entertainers, it spans thirty years of his career. Out of the limelight, the plot emphasizes his personal faults as much as it does his professional successes. Other major characters include his wife Ruby Keeler and his longtime friend and agent Louis Epstein.

Productions 
The West End production, directed by Bettinson, opened on October 26, 1995 at the Victoria Palace Theatre, where it ran for seventeen months. The cast included Brian Conley as Jolson, Sally Ann Triplett as Keeler, and John Bennett as Epstein.

An original cast album was recorded live during the performances of February 29, March 1, and March 2, 1996 and released by First Night Records.

Jolson - The Musical was staged at the Royal Alexandra Theatre in Toronto from June through October 1997. A proposed move to Broadway never materialized. However, a national US tour did occur beginning in October 1998, with the production performing in 34 cities.

Song list
I'm Sitting on Top of the World
Rock-a-Bye Your Baby with a Dixie Melody
Toot-Toot-Tootsie Goodbye
There's a Rainbow Round My Shoulder
Let Me Sing and I'm Happy
For Me and My Gal
You Made Me Love You
Swanee
California Here I Come
Blue Skies
My Mammy
This is the Army, Mr. Jones
I'm Just Wild About Harry
I Only Have Eyes for You
Waiting for the Robert E. Lee
Swanee
Baby Face
Sonny Boy
The Spaniard That Blighted My Life
I'm Just Wild About Harry
Around a Quarter to Nine
Carolina in the Morning
Give My Regards to Broadway
My Mammy (Reprise)

Reception 
Variety received the show negatively, calling it "dull" and criticizing it for overlooking the more controversial parts of Jolson's life and performances.

Awards 
Under the auspices of the Laurence Olivier Awards, it won the American Express Award for Best New Musical. Olivier nominations went to Conley for Best Actor in a Musical and Bennett for Best Supporting Performance in a Musical.

See also
 Jolson Tonight

References

External links
Toronto review

1995 musicals
Biographical musicals
Biographical plays about musicians
British musicals
Laurence Olivier Award-winning musicals
Plays set in the 20th century
Plays set in the United States
West End musicals